Courcoury is a commune in the Charente-Maritime department in southwestern France.

Geography
The Seugne river flows into the Charente in the commune, 2.5 km east of the village.

Population

See also
 Communes of the Charente-Maritime department

References

External links
 

Communes of Charente-Maritime